The LFG Roland G.I was a large prototype single-engine biplane bomber built in Germany in 1915, during World War I. It had a single engine buried in the fuselage driving pusher configuration propellers mounted on outriggers.

Design and development
Although it had twin pusher propellers mounted between the wings and an Idflieg G designation (heavy bomber), it had only a single engine, mounted in the fuselage over the centre of gravity and linked to the propellers by gears and shafts. Hazet radiators mounted on the sides of the fuselage between the wings provided cooling to the adjacent engine.

The G.I had unstaggered unequal span wings, straight edged and of constant chord and with three bays per side defined by parallel interplane struts. Its fuselage was flat sided with a rounded nose whose profile containing the gunner's position. the pilot's cockpit was immediately behind the gunner but ahead of the wing leading edge. The Maybach Mb.IVa water-cooled six cylinder inline engine was directly behind the pilot driving two propellers placed on outriggers in the inner bays. The fuselage was tapered toward the tail, where a broad chord, triangular fin carried a rectangular rudder that extended below the fuselage. The undercarriage was conventional, with wheels on a single axle mounted on a pair of V-struts to the fuselage. There was also a tail skid and a pair of smaller wheels mounted under the nose to avoid nose-overs.

Specifications

References

Biplanes
1910s German aircraft
LFG Roland G.I
Aircraft first flown in 1915